Canadian National 3377 is a preserved class "S-1-d" 2-8-2 "Mikado" type steam locomotive currently on display at the Steamtown National Historic Site in Scranton, Pennsylvania.

History 
Canadian National 3377 was built in 1919 by the Canadian Locomotive Company for the Canadian Government Railways where it was numbered 2977. It was later renumbered to 3377 and would spend the rest of its career operating on the Canadian National Railway. It was eventually retired from revenue service in 1961.

The locomotive was sold to the Edaville Railroad in September 1961, and then was later moved to Bellows Falls, Vermont and became part of the Steamtown, U.S.A. collection. No. 3377 was the target of copper thieves during its trip to Steamtown; it was never repaired and has been cannibalized for parts for Steamtown's operating Canadian National 2-8-2, No. 3254, including the tender, which helped replace 3254's original tender that was scrapped in 2010 due to rust leaks.

As of 2022, the locomotive sits on static display south of the Steamtown shops. Despite its use as a parts source, Steamtown has stated that No. 3377 will possibly be the next candidate for restoration to operating condition, once the restoration of Boston and Maine 3713 is completed, due to sister locomotive No. 3254's poor condition.

References

3377
2-8-2 locomotives
CLC locomotives
Preserved steam locomotives of Canada
Individual locomotives of Canada
Railway locomotives introduced in 1919
Standard gauge locomotives of Canada
Standard gauge locomotives of the United States
Preserved steam locomotives of Pennsylvania